John Palmer may refer to:

People

Politicians
John Palmer (fl. 1377–1394), English politician
Sir John Palmer, 5th Baronet (1735–1817), British politician
John Palmer (1785–1840), U.S. congressman from New York
John Palmer (1842–1905), secretary of state of New York and commander-in-chief of the Grand Army of the Republic
John Hinde Palmer (1808–1884), English barrister and Liberal Party politician
John William Palmer (1866–1958), U.S. Representative from Missouri
John M. Palmer (politician) (1817–1900), U.S. Civil War general and governor and senator from Illinois
John R. Palmer (1809–1877), Michigan politician

Architects
John Palmer (architect) (1785–1846), English architect
John Palmer (Bath architect) (1738–1817), English architect

Religious figures
John Palmer (Unitarian, 1729?–1790), English minister, active in the Midlands and north
John Palmer (Unitarian, 1742–1786), English minister, active in the south
John Palmer (Master of Magdalene College) (died 1607), English clergyman and academic
John Palmer (Archdeacon of Southern Melanesia) (1837–1902)

Military
John M. Palmer (politician) (1817–1900), U.S. Civil War general and governor of Illinois
John McAuley Palmer (general) (1870–1955), American First World War general and military theorist

Sports
John Palmer (cricketer) (1881–1928), English cricketer
Johnny Palmer (1918–2006), golfer
Bud Palmer (John S. Palmer; 1921–2013), New York Knicks player

Music
John Palmer (musician) (born 1943), English musician
John Palmer (composer) (born 1959), composer of instrumental and electronic music
John F. Palmer (1870?–?), American songwriter

Criminals
John Palmer, alias of highwayman Dick Turpin (1705–1739)
John Palmer (criminal) (1950–2015), convicted time-share fraudster, nicknamed "Goldfinger"

Other people
John Palmer, 4th Earl of Selborne (1940–2021), British peer and businessman
John Palmer (actor) (1742?–1798), English actor
John Palmer (author) (1885–1944), English author
John Palmer (Commissary of New South Wales) (1760–1833)
John Palmer (director) (1943–2020), Canadian film and theatre director
John Palmer (postal innovator) (1742–1818), inventor of the lightweight mail coach
John Palmer (colonial administrator) (c. 1650 – c. 1700), first Englishman to purchase land in the Rockaway Peninsula
John Palmer (TV journalist) (1935–2013), former NBC News correspondent
John Horsley Palmer (1779–1858), English banker and Governor of the Bank of England
John J. Palmer (born 1965), metallurgist and author of How to Brew
John Anderson Palmer (born 1965), American philosopher
John Ross Palmer (born 1974), American artist
Johnny Ace Palmer (born late 1950s), American magician

Characters
John Palmer (Home and Away), fictional character
Johnny Palmer (Family Affairs), fictional character

Buildings
John Denham Palmer House, a historic site in Fernandina Beach, Florida

Ships
John Palmer (1807 ship)
John Palmer (1810 ship)
John Palmer (1814 schooner), a ship wrecked in Bass Strait in 1818

See also
Jonathan Palmer (born 1956), entrepreneur and racecar driver
Jonathan Palmer (American football) (born 1983), American football offensive lineman